Joachim-Hans Angermeyer (18 December 1923 – 8 May 1997) was a German businessman and politician from the German Free Democratic Party. He was a member of the German Bundestag from 1976 to 1980.

Life and career
Angermeyer was born the son of a businessman.  After attending Gymnasium he completed a commercial apprenticeship and worked from 1949 until 1962 as an employee.  In 1975, he became Deputy Chairman of the Advisory Board of casinos in Bad Bentheim and Bad Zwischenahn.  Afterwards, he was managing director of a company in Osnabrück until 1980.

Politics
In 1941, he joined the Nazi Party (membership number 8,559,827).  After the Second World War, he became a member of the German Free Democratic Party.  Angermeyer belonged to the German Bundestag from 1976 to 1980.

References

1923 births
1997 deaths
Businesspeople from Hamburg
Members of the Bundestag for Lower Saxony
Members of the Bundestag 1976–1980
Nazi Party members
Members of the Bundestag for the Free Democratic Party (Germany)